Jaime Gustavo Suaza López (born 25 September 1986) is a Colombian former professional cyclist.

Major results

2003
 1st  Time trial, National Junior Road Championships
2008
 1st Time trial, Pan American Under-23 Road Championships
2012
 3rd Time trial, National Road Championships
2013
 3rd Time trial, National Road Championships

References

External links

1986 births
Living people
Colombian male cyclists